The 1st Platino Awards were presented at the Teatro Anayasi in Panama City, Panama on April 5, 2014 to honour the best in Ibero-American films of 2013. 

Nominations were announced on 13 March 2014. The German Doctor received the most nominations with five.

Gloria won three awards including Best Ibero-American Film and Platino Award for Best Actress for Paulina García.

Winners and nominees

Major awards

Honorary Platino
Sônia Braga

Films with multiple nominations and awards 

The following films received multiple nominations:

The following films received multiple awards:

References

External links
Official site

1
Platino Awards
2014 in Panama